Bulgarian-South African relations are foreign relations between Bulgaria  and South Africa. Interest Offices between South Africa and Bulgaria were opened initially in November 1990 and full diplomatic relations was established on February 2, 1992.  Bulgaria has an embassy in Pretoria and South Africa is represented in Bulgaria through its embassy in Athens (Greece).

See also 
 Foreign relations of Bulgaria
 Foreign relations of South Africa

External links 
  South African Department of Foreign Affairs about relations with Bulgaria

 
South Africa
Bilateral relations of South Africa